Listen is an album by Irish folk singer Christy Moore, released in Ireland on 17 April 2009 by Columbia Records. Recorded with long-time accompanist Declan Sinnott, it is his first studio album since 2005's Burning Times. The album debuted at number one on the Irish Albums Chart.

Track listing
 "Listen" (Hank Wedel) – 2:48
 "Does This Train Stop on Merseyside?" (Ian Prowse) – 3:32
 "Shine On You Crazy Diamond" (David Gilmour, Richard Wright, Roger Waters) – 5:07
 "The Ballad of Ruby Walsh" (Christy Moore) – 3:39
 "China Waltz" (Donagh Long) – 3:11
 "Barrowland" (Christy Moore, Wally Page) – 3:15
 "Duffy's Cut" (Tony Boylan, Wally Page) – 3:30
 "The Disappeared (Los Desaparacidos)" (Wally Page) – 3:19
 "Ridin' the High Stool" (Christy Moore) – 3:04
 "Gortatagort" (John Spillane) – 3:42
 "I Will" (Dick Glasser) – 3:05
 "John O'Dreams" (Bill Caddick) – 3:06
 "Rory's Gone" (Christy Moore, Nigel Rolfe) – 3:39

Personnel
Christy Moore – vocals, guitar, bodhrán
Declan Sinnott – guitalele, mandola, keyboards, banjo, vocals
Eleanor Healy – bass, vocals
Martin Leahy – drums, percussion
Pat Crowley – accordion
Neil Martin – cello
Wally Page – vocals

2009 albums
Christy Moore albums
Columbia Records albums